Blistered Horn Mill, also known as the Brunswick Mill, is an abandoned stamp mill located  south of Tincup in Gunnison County, Colorado, United States. Built around 1890 by the Brunswick Mining and Milling Company, the mill processed gold ore from the nearby Jimmy Mack and Blistered Horn Tunnel mines.

The mill had the capacity to process 100 tons of ore daily. A 20-stamp mill ground the ore, powered by a 150-horsepower engine. The boilers were fueled by wood and coal.

Today the mill is partially collapsed.

Notes

Mining in Colorado
History of Colorado
Gunnison National Forest